Zhujiang Power Station or  Yangxi Zhujiang power station is a large coal-fired power station in Guangzhou China.

See also 

 List of coal power stations
 List of power stations in China

External links 

 Yangxi Zhujiang power station on Global Energy Monitor

References 

Coal-fired power stations in China